Matthew John Amorello (born March 15, 1958) is a former Massachusetts state senator and former chairman of the Massachusetts Turnpike Authority who presided over the Central Artery/Third Harbor Tunnel Project (Big Dig) from 2002 to 2006. The Massachusetts Turnpike Authority is the agency that was in charge of the Big Dig project.

After the collapse of a portion of the roof of the I-90 Connector Tunnel on July 10, 2006 in which 38-year-old Milena Del Valle, of Jamaica Plain, was killed, Massachusetts Governor Mitt Romney called for Amorello's resignation. On July 27, 2006, Amorello agreed to resign, effective August 15.

Romney pinned much of the blame for the collapse on the Massachusetts Turnpike Authority and promised to take legal action to oust Amorello after countless defects in the tunnels were discovered including hundreds of leaks and signs that structural bolts were loosening.

When he was appointed chairman of the Turnpike Authority in 2002, Amorello, a longtime state senator from Grafton, inherited the Big Dig project that was already billions of dollars over budget and years past the original completion date. His task was to get it finished and he did. A year later he was cutting the ribbons to open both the north and south sides of the Thomas P. O’Neill Jr. tunnels, and the I-90 Connector Tunnel but by 2005, both tunnels were leaking.

Amorello was also criticized for a failure to hold contractors accountable for mistakes on the project and drew criticism for accepting a Man of the Year award from a group of contractors.

In 2008, he appeared before the State Ethics Commission to answer charges that he violated conflict-of-interest laws by changing sick leave policy that would affect him. He was later fined $2,000.

In 2009, Amorello and one of his brothers co-founded Mayo Renewable Energy, a company focusing on solar energy.

On Monday August 9, 2010, a judge issued a warrant for Amorello's arrest when he failed to show up in court to face a drunken driving charge. He was charged with drunken driving and leaving the scene after causing property damage. Amorello was ordered to give up his driver’s license for 45 days and pay up to $1,300 in fines. He must also enter an alcohol treatment program.

Education
Grafton Memorial High School; Assumption College, B.A.; The American University, M.P.A.; Suffolk University, J.D.

See also
 1993–1994 Massachusetts legislature

References

1958 births
Living people
Suffolk University Law School alumni
American University School of Public Affairs alumni
Assumption University (Worcester) alumni
Republican Party Massachusetts state senators